The northern fulmar (Fulmarus glacialis), fulmar, or Arctic fulmar is a highly abundant seabird found primarily in subarctic regions of the North Atlantic and North Pacific oceans. There has been one confirmed sighting in the Southern Hemisphere, with a single bird seen south of New Zealand. Fulmars come in one of two color morphs: a light one, with white head and body and gray wings and tail, and a dark one, which is uniformly gray. Though similar in appearance to gulls, fulmars are in fact members of the family Procellariidae, which include petrels and shearwaters.

The northern fulmar and its sister species, the southern fulmar, are the extant members of the genus . The fulmars are in turn a member of the order Procellariiformes, and they all share certain identifying features. First, they have nasal passages that attach to the upper bill called naricorns; however, nostrils on albatrosses are on the sides of the bill, as opposed to the rest of the order, including fulmars, which have nostrils on top of the upper bill. The bills of Procellariiformes are also unique in that they are split into between seven and nine horny plates. One of these plates makes up the hooked portion of the upper bill, called the maxillary unguis. They produce a stomach oil made up of wax esters and triglycerides that is stored in the proventriculus. This can be sprayed out of their mouths as a defense against predators from a very early age, and as an energy rich food source for chicks and for the adults during their long flights. It will mat the plumage of avian predators, and can lead to their death. Finally, they also have a salt gland that is situated above the nasal passage that helps desalinate their bodies, due to the high amount of ocean water that they imbibe. This gland excretes a high saline solution from their nose.

The Mallemuk Mountain in Northeastern Greenland is named after the northern fulmar.

Taxonomy
The northern fulmar was formally described by the Swedish naturalist Carl Linnaeus in 1761 in the second edition of his book Fauna Svecica. He placed it with the other petrels in the genus Procellaria and coined the binomial name Procellaria glacialis. Linnaeus based his description mainly on the "Mallemucke" that had been described and illustrated in 1675 by the German naturalist Friderich Martens in his account of his voyage to Spitzbergen. The northern fulmar is now placed in the genus Fulmarus that was introduced in 1826 by the English naturalist James Stephens. The genus name comes from the Old Norse Fúlmár meaning "foul-mew" or "foul-gull" because of the birds' habit of ejecting a foul-smelling oil. The specific epithet  is Latin for "icy".

Three subspecies are recognised:
 F. g. glacialis (Linnaeus, 1761) – the nominate race, which breeds in the high Arctic regions of the North Atlantic
 F. g. auduboni Bonaparte, 1857 – breeds in the low Arctic and boreal regions of the North Atlantic
 F. g. rodgersii Cassin, 1862 – breeds on the coast of eastern Siberia and the Alaskan Peninsula

Description

This species is gray and white with a pale yellow, thick bill and bluish legs. However, there are both a light morph and dark, or "blue," morph; in the Pacific Ocean there is an intermediate morph as well. Only the dark morph has more than dark edges on the underneath but they all have pale inner primaries on the top of the wings. The Pacific morph has a darker tail than the Atlantic morph.

Like other petrels, their walking ability is limited, but they are strong fliers, with a stiff wing action quite unlike the gulls. They look bull-necked compared to gulls, and have short stubby bills. They are long-lived, with a lifespan of 31 years not uncommon.

Behaviour

Feeding
This fulmar will feed on shrimp, fish, squid, plankton, jellyfish, and carrion, as well as refuse. When eating fish, they will dive up to several feet deep to retrieve their prey.

Breeding

The northern fulmar starts breeding at between six and twelve years old. It is monogamous, and forms long-term pair bonds. It returns to the same nest site year after year. The breeding season starts in May; however, the female has glands that store sperm to allow weeks to pass between copulation and the laying of the egg. During the breeding season adult Fulmars usually remain within 500 km of their breeding colony instead of traveling up to thousands of kilometers while searching for food. Their nest is a scrape on a grassy ledge or a saucer of vegetation on the ground, lined with softer material. The birds nest in large colonies Recently, they have started nesting on rooftops and buildings. Both sexes are involved in the nest-building process. A single white egg, is incubated for a period of 50 to 54 days, by both sexes. The altricial chick is brooded for 2 weeks and fully fledges after 70 to 75 days. Again, both sexes are involved. During this period, the parents are nocturnal, and will even be inactive on well-lit nights.

Social behaviour
The mating ritual of this fulmar consists of the female resting on a ledge and the male landing with his bill open and his head back. He commences to wave his head side to side and up and down while calling.

They make grunting and chuckling sounds while eating and guttural calls during the breeding season.

Conservation
The range of these species increased greatly last century due to the availability of fish offal from commercial fleets, but may contract because of less food from this source and climatic change. The population increase has been especially notable in the British Isles.

Anthropogenic impact 
Northern fulmars' stomach contents are a hallmark indicator of marine debris in marine environments because of their high abundance and wide distribution. A study of 143 northern fulmars from 2008 to 2013 found 89.5% of them containing microplastics within their gastrointestinal tracts. A mean score of 19.5 pieces of plastic and 0.461 g per individual was calculated. This is considerably higher than in past studies on northern fulmars, possibly implying increasing plastic debris in marine ecosystems and shorelines. However, more research is needed to substantiate such conclusion. Long-term data from the Netherlands dating back to the 1980s show an increase in consumer plastics and a decrease in industrial plastics in the stomach contents of fulmars. The increased plastic ingestion can occur through biomagnification: their diet consists of such invertebrates like plankton that have shown an increase of consumption of microplastics entering the ocean. By going deeper into the food web of marine life, it is evident that fulmars could be indirectly affected through tropic transfer and biomagnification, and similarly could also affect their predators ingestion of plastic pollution. With the increase in freshwater pollution of plastic debris, there may be a further rise in microplastic content of seabird gastrointestinal tracts.

References

Sources

External links

 
 
 
 
 

northern fulmar
Birds of the Arctic
Birds of Iceland
Birds of Europe
northern fulmar
Holarctic birds
northern fulmar